Erik Krag (13 January 1902 – 13 May 1987) was a Norwegian literary historian, translator, novelist and playwright. He was born in Copenhagen, a son of novelist Thomas Krag and poet Iben Nielsen. Krag is known as the founder of Slavic literary history as academic discipline in Norway. He was a professor at the University of Oslo from 1946 to 1969. His monography  Dostojevskij from 1962 was translated into English in 1976, and he has also published works on Leo Tolstoi and on Russian theatre.

Selected works
Ottar Wreike (1922) 
Leo Tolstoj (1937) 
En liten manns bryllup (1952)
Dostojevskij (1962) 
Den barnløse (1966)

References

1902 births
1987 deaths
People from Copenhagen
Norwegian literary historians
University of Oslo alumni
Academic staff of the University of Oslo
20th-century Norwegian translators
20th-century Norwegian novelists
20th-century Norwegian dramatists and playwrights
Norwegian male dramatists and playwrights
Norwegian male novelists